The men's 200 metres event at the 2020 Summer Olympics took place on 3 and 4 August 2021 at the Olympic Stadium. 48 athletes from 33 nations competed, including five universality places (one universality place was used in 2016). Canada earned its first gold medal in the event since 1928 and third overall, as Andre De Grasse added gold to his 2016 silver to become the 12th man to earn multiple medals in the 200 metres. Kenneth Bednarek and Noah Lyles, both of the United States, took silver and bronze as Americans reached the podium for the first time since 2008 (where they coincidentally also won two medals: a silver, and a bronze). Jamaica's three-Games gold medal streak in the event ended, with Usain Bolt having retired.

Summary
As the reigning World Champion, Noah Lyles came in as the favorite, but he was challenged in the US Trials by Kenny Bednarek and 17 year old Erriyon Knighton. Lyles left Eugene with the fastest time of the year. Andre De Grasse was the returning silver medalist. Adam Gemili, Alonso Edward, and Ramil Guliyev returned from five years earlier, but only De Grasse was able to qualify out of the semi-final round and he did so in style, breaking his own Canadian Record set in the semi-finals of the 2016 Olympics. This time too, he was eased up looking back at Bednarek in the last stages of this race. The second semi produced drama as Aaron Brown took an early lead with a fast start. Lyles passed him with his typical speed coming off the turn, then eased up to save energy at the finish allowing Brown to catch him at the line. Surprising both of them was another American high schooler, Joseph Fahnbulleh running for Liberia, coming from well off the pace to pip Lyles at the line. All three were timed in 19.99, a new Liberian Record. The favorite, Lyles in third, had to rely on time to get into the final.

In the final, De Grasse reacted fastest and his Canadian teammate Brown got a good start, both of them making up ground on the stagger of the Americans to their outside, Bednarek and 17 year old Erriyon Knighton respectively. Through the second half of the turn, Bednarek and Lyles asserted themselves to hit the straightaway together with a slight lead. This is where Lyles usually shines but he didn't show the same dominating top end speed coming off the turn. De Grasse ended the turn slightly behind, but came back to battle Bednarek next to him and Lyles across the track. Knighton passed Brown but it was De Grasse who had the closing speed, passing and opening up a small gap on Bednarek. In the last 20 metres, Bednarek narrowed the gap to De Grasse slightly, but it was a clear win for De Grasse. De Grasse was timed in 19.62 into a −0.5 mps wind.

With his 19.62, De Grasse finally moved into the 200m top 10 of all time, a status foretold six years earlier with a wind-aided 19.58 while competing for the University of Southern California. Bednarek in second ran 19.68 to claim a tie with Frankie Fredericks (second behind Michael Johnson at the 1996 Olympics). Fahnbulleh came from dead last to reach 19.98, improving his Liberian national record. 17 year old Knighton finished fourth, setting an American age record.

It was the first time in the Olympic history that five men dipped below 20 seconds in an Olympic 200m final.

Background
This was the 28th time the event was held; it was not held at the first 1896 Olympics but has been on the program ever since.

Brunei made its men's 200 metres debut. The United States made its 27th appearance in the event, most of any nation, having missed only the boycotted 1980 Games.

Qualification

A National Olympic Committee (NOC) could enter up to three qualified athletes in the men's 200 metres event if all athletes meet the entry standard or qualify by ranking during the qualifying period. (The limit of three has been in place since the 1930 Olympic Congress.) The qualifying standard is 20.24 seconds. This standard was "set for the sole purpose of qualifying athletes with exceptional performances unable to qualify through the IAAF World Rankings pathway." The world rankings, based on the average of the best five results for the athlete over the qualifying period and weighted by the importance of the meet, will then be used to qualify athletes until the cap of 56 is reached.

The qualifying period was originally from 1 May 2019 to 29 June 2020. Due to the COVID-19 pandemic, the period was suspended from 6 April 2020 to 30 November 2020, with the end date extended to 29 June 2021. The world rankings period start date was also changed from 1 May 2019 to 30 June 2020; athletes who had met the qualifying standard during that time were still qualified, but those using world rankings would not be able to count performances during that time. The qualifying time standards could be obtained in various meets during the given period that have the approval of the IAAF. Only outdoor meets were eligible for the sprints and short hurdles, including the 200 metres. The most recent Area Championships may be counted in the ranking, even if not during the qualifying period.

NOCs can also use their universality place—each NOC can enter one male athlete regardless of time if they had no male athletes meeting the entry standard for an athletics event—in the 200 metres.

Entry number: 56.

Withdrawn after qualification by standard or ranking: Miguel Francis, Benjamin Azamati-Kwaku, Zharnel Hughes, Christophe Lemaitre, Mouhamadou Fall, Méba-Mickaël Zeze, Jeffrey John, Paulo André de Oliveira.

Of the finalists from the 2016 Games:
 Three-time gold medalist Usain Bolt retired and did not return.
 Silver medalist Andre De Grasse qualified.
 Bronze medalist Christophe Lemaitre qualified but withdrawn.
 Fourth-place finisher Adam Gemili qualified.
 Fifth-place finisher Churandy Martina did qualify.
 Sixth-place finisher LaShawn Merritt was not selected through US trials.
 Seventh-place finisher Alonso Edward of Panama qualified.
 Eight-place finisher Ramil Guliyev qualified.

Competition format
The event continued to use the three rounds format introduced in 2012. There were 7 heats, with the top 3 runners in each heat and the next 3 overall advancing to the semifinals. There were 3 semifinals, with the top 2 in each semifinal and next 2 overall advancing to the final.

Records
Prior to this competition, the existing world and Olympic records were as follows.

The following national records were established during the competition:

Schedule
All times are Japan Standard Time (UTC+9)

The men's 200 metres took place over two consecutive days.

Results

Round 1
Qualification Rules: First 3 in each heat (Q) and the next 3 fastest (q) advance to Semifinals.

Heat 1

Heat 2

Heat 3

Heat 4

Heat 5

Heat 6

Heat 7

Semifinals
Qualification rules: First 2 in each heat (Q) and the next 2 fastest (q) advance to the final.

Semi-final 1

Semi-final 2

Semi-final 3

Final

References

Men's 200 metres
2020
Men's events at the 2020 Summer Olympics